Elkann is a  French-Jewish surname. Notable people with the surname include:

Alain Elkann (born 1950), an Italian novelist and journalist of Jewish descent, with French and American lineage
Ginevra Elkann (born 1979), an apprentice film director, granddaughter of Gianni Agnelli
John Elkann (born 1976), an Italian industrialist, grandson of the late Gianni Agnelli, heir to the automaker Fiat
Lapo Elkann (born 1977), a New York-born Italian industrialist, former marketing manager

See also 
 Elkan, a surname and given name